Mialitiana Clerc (born 16 November 2001 in Ambohitrimanjaka, Madagascar) is an alpine skier from Madagascar. Clerc competed for Madagascar at the 2018 Winter Olympics in the alpine skiing events. Clerc became the first female to compete for Madagascar at the Winter Olympics. Clerc was born in Madagascar and was adopted by a French family at the age of one. She learned to ski in France.

Clerc's results at the 2018 Winter Olympics:

References

2001 births
Alpine skiers at the 2018 Winter Olympics
Alpine skiers at the 2022 Winter Olympics
Malagasy female alpine skiers
Olympic alpine skiers of Madagascar
Living people
French sportspeople of Malagasy descent
French adoptees
People from Analamanga
Black French sportspeople